Conrad John Eustace Meyer (2 July 1922 – 23 July 2011) was an English Catholic priest and a former Church of England bishop.

Meyer was the son of William Eustace Meyer. He was educated at Clifton College and Pembroke College, Cambridge. During the Second World War he served in the Royal Naval Volunteer Reserve. He was made deacon in Advent 1948 (19 December) and ordained priest the following Advent (18 December 1949) — both times by Frederick Cockin, Bishop of Bristol, at Bristol Cathedral. His first ordained ministry positions were curacies at Ashton Gate and Kenwyn. He was vicar of Devoran from 1954 to 1964. From 1969 to 1979 he was Archdeacon of Bodmin. On 25 January 1979, he was consecrated a bishop by Donald Coggan, Archbishop of Canterbury, at Westminster Abbey; to serve as Bishop suffragan of Dorchester, a position that he held until 1987; he became the first area bishop in 1984 when the diocese's area scheme was erected. From 1990 to 1994 he was an honorary assistant bishop in the Diocese of Truro.

In February 1994, Meyer announced his decision to be received into full communion with the Catholic Church; in September 1994, Meyer became a Roman Catholic and in June 1995 he was ordained as a Roman Catholic priest by Christopher Budd, Roman Catholic Bishop of Plymouth, at Buckfast Abbey. In 2009 he was made a monsignor by Pope Benedict XVI.

References

1922 births
People educated at Clifton College
Alumni of Pembroke College, Cambridge
Royal Naval Volunteer Reserve personnel of World War II
Archdeacons of Bodmin
Anglican bishops of Dorchester
20th-century Church of England bishops
Anglican bishop converts to Roman Catholicism
Anglo-Catholic bishops
English Roman Catholics
2011 deaths
English Anglo-Catholics